Burnside Park could refer to:

Burnside, Nova Scotia, a business park and neighbourhood located in the Dartmouth area of Halifax Regional Municipality
Burnside Park, Providence, Rhode Island, a small park
Burnside Park, Christchurch, a large park and playing field in Christchurch, New Zealand.